Pterolophia dorsivaria is a species of beetle in the family Cerambycidae. It was described by Léon Fairmaire in 1850.

References

dorsivaria
Beetles described in 1850